Vincenzo Caporaletti (born 1955) is an Italian musicologist known for devising audiotactile formativity theory.

Career
Caporaletti was born in 1955 and raised in Roseto degli Abruzzi. He was a founding member of the Italian progressive rock group Pierrot Lunaire in the early 1970s, along with Arturo Stàlteri and Gaio Chiocchio. The first self-titled album. was released in 1974. From this year on, he started to dedicate his attention to the world of jazz, in particular in Rome, collaborating with musicians such as Tony Scott, Giulio Capiozzo and Jimmy Owens.

Caporaletti's research activity in musicology started at the end of the 1970s. One of his first researches was a reflection on the concept of Swing (jazz performance style), developed in his MA thesis taken at the University of Bologna. Inside this thesis he set the basis of the epistemological concept of audiotactility, that later has been defined Audiotactile Principle (ATP). On this concept, he built the framework of the Audiotactile Formativity Theory that introduced to musicology the category audiotactile music.

《Audiotactility》became an official scientific category in 2008 in Italy, when the Ministry of Education emanated the decrees MIUR 22/01/2008, n. 483/2008 and MIUR 03/07/2009, n. 124/2009, which established the new definition frameworks for the subjects taught in Conservatoires of music. These decrees set up two new subjects: "Discipline interpretative del jazz, delle musiche improvvisate e audiotattili" (Jazz, improvised and audiotactile music interpretative disciplines) identifyied with the code CODM/06; "Storia del jazz, delle musiche improvvisate e audiotattili" (History of jazz, improvised and audiotactile music). Caporaletti's works have been published in Italy, France, United Kingdom, Belgium and Brazil Audiotactile formativity theory has been discussed and recognised as a contribution in the study of improvised music by University researchers (Frank Tirro Laurent Cugny) and journalists (Fabio Macaluso, Maurizio Franco</ref>). Caporaletti's articles are also listed in Comparative Musicology website, an online bibliografical database

Caporaletti is the founder of the Ring Shout journal a scientific journal on African-American music. He is the director, along with Fabiano Araujo Costa and Laurent Cugny of the Revue du jazz et des musiques audiotactiles, edited by the IREMUS centre, Sorbonne University, Paris, France; of the collana Grooves - Edizioni di Musiche Audiotattili, published by the Italian editor LIM, Libreria Musicale Italiana, based in Lucca; and of collana Musicologie e Culture, published by the Italian editor Aracne based in Rome.

Caporaletti obtained the National Scientific Habilitation in Italy as Full Professor in Ethnomusicology. He teaches General Musicology and Transcultural Musicology at the University of Macerata in Italy. He is the director of CeIRM, (Centro Interuniversitario per la Ricerca Musicologica or Interuniversity Centre for Musicological Research) a research centre for musicology that groups together the University of Macerata, the Conservatory of Pesaro and the Conservatory of Fermo. He is also Professor at the Conservatorio di Musica "Santa Cecilia" in Rome, where he teaches Analysis of Performative and Compositional forms in Jazz Music.

Audiotactile formativity theory 
Starting from 2000, Caporaletti focused his research on the formalisation of a phenomenological and taxonomical model of musical experience, that, in his book, he has defined with the expression "audiotactile formativity". This model derives from a multidisciplinary reflection which starts from the analysis of the Groove (music) and swing phenomena and ending with a global perspective on the Musical improvisation. Caporaletti identifies with the term "Audiotactile music" those musical practices in which, on the one hand, the formativity of the musical text is fused with the musical actions performed by the musician in real time (Improvisation and/or extemporisation) and, on the other hand, are subjected to a process of phono-fixation through recording technologies. This category encompasses musical practices such as jazz, rock, rap, popular music, world music, Brazilian music and so on. In the precedent interpretative theories, they were identified as musical practices that belong to the written music tradition or the oral music tradition. Auditactile music theory categorises musical manifestations opposing the visual matrix to the audiotactile one, depending on the embedded cognitive work model required to perform or play that particular music, and not considering the sociological aspects of music making. Considered from a phenomenological point of view, the form, experience and musical concepts that belong to Western written musical tradition, spanning from 18th until the first half of the 20th century, are based on a "visual cognitive matrix" while the popular one on a "audiotactile cognitive matrix".

The conceptual framework of audiotactile formativity theory, or theory of the audiotactile music is composed of various pieces: the audiotactile principle [ATP], the neoauratic encoding [NAE], the swing-structure and the swing-idiolect. It is rooted on the philosophy developed by Luigi Pareyson, on the semiotics of Umberto Eco, on the anthropological concepts developed by Alan Merriam, on Marshall McLuhan's mediology and on the cognitive psychology of Michel Imberty. Audiotactile Music theory has its roots also in Neurosciences, using them in an athro-cognitive and anthro-cultural perspective for understanding musical experience, starting from the implications of perception and cognitive capacities through the factor constituted by cultural mediation. The distinction between the Audiotactile and Visual matrix, that looms at the bases of Audiotactile Theory, has been scientifically demonstrated.

This theory is employed as an alternative epistemological paradigm for the musicological studies in jazz, Brazilian music, progressive rock, world music, improvisational and contemporary music. It is at the centre of musicological debates in Italy, France and Brazil. The CRIJMA, Centre international de Recherche sur le Jazz et le Musiques Audiotactiles a centre for the study of Jazz and Audiotactile music, has been founded at the Sorbonne University in 2017. Audiotactile theory undermines and recontextualise the traditional conceptual frameworks of the problematics related to musical analysis, music notation, history of jazz, music ontology, music interaction, music teaching, copyrights and performative arts. SIAE has reviewed and updated the article n.33 if its statute on December 11, 2016, to include audiotactile music among the ones protected under copyright law. The Italian parliament, on the assembly of November 8, 2017, has added the term "audiotactile" to all the acts emanated in order to define more accurately the musical practices once defined only with the term "popular" or "folk" music.

Selected publications

Discography

On Audiotactile Theory

Books

Articles

Other sources

References

1955 births
Living people
People from the Province of Teramo
Italian musicologists